Trismus pseudocamptodactyly syndrome is a rare genetic condition. A defining feature is the inability to open the mouth completely (trismus). Other signs and symptoms include abnormally short tendons and muscles, resulting in contractures, club foot, and other musculoskeletal abnormalities.

Genetics
It is an autosomal dominant condition caused by a mutation in MYH8. Approximately 60 cases have been reported worldwide.

Diagnosis

Treatment
Treatment is symptomatic in nature.

References

External links 

Rare syndromes
Musculoskeletal disorders